Vincent Medina (born 6 October 1986) is a Chochenyo Ohlone indigenous rights, language, and food activist. He is a member of the Muwekma Ohlone Tribe and co-founded Cafe Ohlone, an Ohlone restaurant in Berkeley, California which serves indigenous cuisine made with native ingredients sourced from the San Francisco and Monterey Bay Areas. As of 2019 he was serving on the Muwekma tribal council, and he is Capitán (cultural leader) of the ‘Itmay Cultural Association. He is also a member of the Board of Directors of Advocates for Indigenous California Language Survival. Medina speaks English, Spanish, and Chochenyo.

Career 
Medina was the assistant curator and a docent for seven years at Mission Dolores in San Francisco.

Starting in 2011 he wrote a blog about his experience as an Ohlone person in the 21st century and learning and sharing the Chochenyo language. He started a column in News from Native California called In Our Languages dedicated to writing in indigenous California languages. News from Native California is published by the non-profit Heyday, where Medina has been the Berkeley Roundhouse Outreach Coordinator since 2013. Heyday's Berkeley Roundhouse was formerly called the California Indian Publishing Program, and is dedicated to celebrating indigenous California culture and supporting the local Indian community.

Medina has been on the board of directors of Advocates for Indigenous California Language Survival since 2012. He co-founded Cafe Ohlone in 2018. He is also one of a few rotating hosts of Bay Native Circle, a weekly indigenous radio program and podcast which airs on KPFA.

Chochenyo language 
Chochenyo falls under the ISO 639-3 code for "Northern Ohlone," which also includes Ramaytush, Tamyen, Awaswas, and Chalon. There has been debate among linguists as to whether these varieties are different enough from each other to be called separate languages, or whether they should be classified as dialects of the same language, but Medina and the Muwekma Ohlone Tribe consider Chochenyo  to be a distinct language.

Medina was introduced to Chochenyo as a child, but began learning the language deeply around 2010 by studying the field notes produced by J. P. Harrington, who worked with native Chochenyo speakers in the early 20th century to document their language. By 2012 Medina could speak Chochenyo with others, and as he became more proficient, he began teaching his younger brother their ancestors' language as well. In 1934, the only native speaker of Chochenyo died, but in the 2000s the Muwekma Ohlone Tribe and linguists at UC Berkeley began to learn and revitalize the language, and in 2009 Northern Ohlone was reclassified from Extinct to Living by SIL International (and therefore Ethnologue and ISO).

Medina started the In Our Languages column of News from Native California and wrote the first piece in Chochenyo in 2014. He has spoken at a number of libraries, museums, and conferences about the Chochenyo language and indigenous issues. In 2015 he was chosen to read verses in Chochenyo during the Mass at the canonization ceremony for Father Serra, and he took advantage of the opportunity which would mean hundreds of millions of people hearing the language.

Ohlone cuisine 
In 2018, Medina co-founded Cafe Ohlone (Chochenyo: mak-'amham, "our food") with his partner Louis Trevino, who is Rumsen Ohlone. It is a pop-up restaurant, formerly located at the University Press Books bookstore in Berkeley. The menu changes seasonally, and ingredients are gathered by Native people around Ohlone territory. Dishes include acorn soup and acorn bread, watercress and sorrel salad with berries and seeds, quail eggs, venison, chia pudding, and a variety of teas. Meals are accompanied by information about Ohlone history and culture, and sometimes songs.

During the COVID-19 pandemic, University Press Books permanently closed, and Cafe Ohlone began offering foot-square wooden takeout boxes in lieu of communal dining. They planned to reopen the café in the courtyard of the Hearst Museum of Anthropology at UC Berkeley in November 2021, later postponed to winter 2022 and then moved forward again to spring 2022.

References

External links 
 Medina's former blog

1986 births
Living people
Native Americans' rights activists
Native American chefs
Chefs from Berkeley, California